Julius Aleksanteri Junttila (born 15 August 1991) is a Finnish professional ice hockey forward. He currently plays for Oulun Kärpät in the SM-liiga.

Playing career
Junttila made his SM-liiga debut playing with Oulun Kärpät during the 2009–10 SM-liiga season. After seven seasons in the top flight Liiga, with Oulun Kärpät, he opted to move abroad to Sweden in agreeing to a two-year contract with Luleå HF of the Swedish Hockey League (SHL) on 21 April 2016. He returned to Finland and Kärpät for the 2016–17 season.

On 7 May 2020, Junttila returned to the KHL in signing a two-year contract with Finnish competitors, Jokerit.

Career statistics

Regular season and playoffs

International

References

External links
 

1991 births
Living people
Finnish ice hockey forwards
Jokerit players
Luleå HF players
Oulun Kärpät players
Sportspeople from Oulu
Ice hockey players at the 2018 Winter Olympics
Olympic ice hockey players of Finland
HC Sibir Novosibirsk players
Växjö Lakers players